Morcenx-la-Nouvelle is a commune in the Landes department in Nouvelle-Aquitaine in southwestern France. It was established on 1 January 2019 by merger of the former communes of Morcenx (the seat), Arjuzanx, Garrosse and Sindères.

See also
Communes of the Landes department

References

Communes of Landes (department)
States and territories established in 2019